The Roman Catholic Diocese of Magangué is a diocese located in the city of Magangué in the Ecclesiastical province of Cartagena in Colombia.

History
 25 April 1969: Established as Diocese of Magangué from the Metropolitan Archdiocese of Cartagena

Ordinaries
Eloy Tato Losada, I.E.M.E. (1969.04.25 – 1994.05.31)
Armando Larios Jiménez (1994.05.31 – 2001.03.08) Appointed, Bishop of Riohacha
Jorge Leonardo Gómez Serna, O.P. (2001.11.03 – 2012.07.30)
Ariel Lascarro Tapia (21 November 2014 - )

See also
Roman Catholicism in Colombia

Sources

External links
 GCatholic.org

Roman Catholic dioceses in Colombia
Roman Catholic Ecclesiastical Province of Cartagena
Christian organizations established in 1969
Roman Catholic dioceses and prelatures established in the 20th century